John McCallum  (born 9 April 1950) is a Canadian politician, economist, diplomat and former university professor. A former Liberal Member of Parliament (MP), McCallum was the Canadian Ambassador to China from 2017 to 2019. He was asked for his resignation by Prime Minister Trudeau in 2019. As an MP, he represented the electoral district of Markham—Thornhill, and had previously represented Markham—Unionville and Markham. He is a member of the Queen's Privy Council for Canada.

A veteran federal politician who began his political career in 2000, McCallum has served in the governments of Liberal prime ministers Jean Chrétien, Paul Martin, and Justin Trudeau. McCallum has previously been Secretary of State (International Financial Institutions), Minister of National Defence, Minister of Veterans Affairs, and Minister of Immigration, Refugees and Citizenship.

Early life and education 
McCallum was born in Montreal, Quebec, the son of Joan (Patteson) and Alexander Campbell McCallum. He received his secondary education at Selwyn House School and Trinity College School. He has a Bachelor of Arts degree from Queens' College, Cambridge University, a diplôme d'études supérieures from Université de Paris I and a PhD degree in economics from McGill University.

Academic career (1976–1994) 
McCallum was a professor of economics at the University of Manitoba from 1976 until 1978, Simon Fraser University from 1978 until 1982, the Université du Québec à Montréal from 1982 until 1987, and McGill University from 1987 until 1994. He is an honorary member of the Royal Military College of Canada, student .

He was also Dean of the Faculty of Arts at McGill University, when his future boss, Justin Trudeau was a student there. He then became Senior Vice-President and Chief Economist of the Royal Bank of Canada.

One of his most influential academic contributions was an article in The American Economic Review, which introduced the concept of the home bias in trade puzzle. It has spawned an ongoing international debate  on whether trade within a nation state is greater than trade among nations, as compared with the predictions of standard economic models.

As McGill University's Dean of Arts, McCallum secured a $10 million contribution from Charles Bronfman for the establishment of the McGill Institute for the Study of Canada.

He also participated in the national unity debates of the early 1990s, editing the Canada Round Series of the C. D. Howe Institute and engaging in debate with then Opposition Leader Jacques Parizeau at Quebec's National Assembly.

Private sector career (1994–2000; 2019 onward) 
McCallum was the Royal Bank of Canada's chief economist for six years. He consistently achieved the highest media coverage of bank chief economists, making regular appearances on CBC's The National as an economics panellist. He also engaged in social issues, notably a 1997 Royal Bank conference designed to align the business community with the recommendations of the 1996 Report on the Royal Commission on Aboriginal Peoples. His paper at that conference, "The Cost of Doing Nothing", was highlighted ten years later in the Aboriginal Times magazine.

In July 2020, McCallum's employment by the Wailian Group, a Chinese company that assists with immigration to Canada, sparked calls from oppositions MPs and Democracy Watch for McCullum to be investigated by the Ethics Commissioner for potential breaches of the Conflict of Interest Act.

Political career

Member of Parliament (2000–2017) 
McCallum successfully nominated Nelson Mandela as the second honorary citizen in Canadian history.

McCallum was quite vocal in Canada's debate on same-sex marriage. He told the Edmonton Sun in August 2003, "If people want to do something and it doesn't hurt other people, doesn't reduce other people's rights, we should let them do it. Why not?" He also significantly contributed to the final debate before the vote on same-sex marriage on 21 March 2005 saying:
I believe we should always seek to expand the rights of our fellow citizens as long as we do not thereby reduce the rights of others. We should seek to ensure that no group is denied full participation in society. As members of Parliament, we should not ask the question, why should we extend this right? Rather our question should be, why should we not extend the right? Let the burden of proof be on those who wish to limit fundamental rights.
...
Many Canadians will want to accept both of these principles: protect the traditional definition of marriage and protect the rights of minorities. The essence of my message today is that we cannot do both. We cannot have it both ways. We must make a choice between traditional marriage and the protection of minority rights.

Defence Minister (2002–2003) 
As Defence Minister under Jean Chrétien, McCallum achieved what was then the largest increase in the annual defence budget ($1 billion) in more than a decade in return for offering up $200 million in savings from reducing low priority spending. He also retroactively reversed an inequity which awarded up to $250,000 to military personnel who lost their eyesight or a limb while on active service - but only to those with the rank of colonel or above. Now all Canadian Forces members are covered by the plan regardless of rank. Working with Germany, he successfully persuaded NATO to take control over the security mission in Kabul, Afghanistan, while also ensuring that the mission was led by Canada. He also determined that the army, rather than the navy or air force, was to be the top priority in budget allocations.

He became widely known and criticized in 2002 when he admitted, while serving as the Minister of National Defence, that he had never heard of the 1942 Dieppe raid, a fateful and nationally significant operation for Canadian Forces during the Second World War. Ironically, he wrote a letter to the editor of the National Post in response, but committed a further gaffe, confusing Canadian participation in the 1917 Battle of Vimy Ridge in France with Vichy France from 1940 to 1944. Response at the continued historical ignorance prompted outrage and humour among the press.

In November 2002, while still serving as Defence Minister, McCallum encountered further controversy when officials refused to allow him to board an Air Canada flight because his breath smelt heavily of alcohol. McCallum announced soon thereafter that the incident prompted him to abstain completely from alcohol consumption. He reportedly also intended to lose weight and give up smoking.

In January 2003, McCallum suggested Canadian troops could avoid so-called "friendly fire" incidents by wearing some of female Conservative MP Elsie Wayne's clothes. McCallum later apologized both inside and outside the House of Commons for using inappropriate language, blaming the excitement of the moment, and had his apologies accepted by Wayne.

Veterans Affairs Minister (2003–2004)
Under Paul Martin, McCallum introduced a new charter for younger, postwar veterans who have been physically or mentally injured while serving in the Canadian Forces. This charter, which became law in 2005, is modelled on the range of services provided for returning veterans after World War II. This "new model" stripped veterans of a monthly pension opting for a lump sum payment.

Revenue Minister (2004–2006) 
As Minister of National Revenue and Chair of the Cabinet's Expenditure Review Committee, McCallum achieved in 2005 expenditure reductions of $11 billion over the next five years.

Shadow Cabinet Immigration Critic (2006–2015) 
When the Conservatives came to power in January 2006 under Stephen Harper, McCallum was appointed as the Immigration Critic. During his time in the opposition, Mr. McCallum began to travel extensively to China at the expense of Beijing-friendly groups. McCallum took trips valued at $73,300 from pro-Beijing business groups, such as the Canadian Confederation of Fujian Associations.

Immigration Minister (2015–2017) 
On 4 November 2015, he was appointed the Minister of Immigration, Refugees and Citizenship in the newly elected 29th Canadian Ministry of Justin Trudeau. As a senior cabinet minister, McCallum was then fourth in line in case of the PM's incapacity. As Immigration Minister, he oversaw the intake of Syrian refugees during the Syrian refugee crisis.

Ambassador to China (2017–2019) 
On 10 January 2017, it was announced that McCallum would be appointed as Canada's Ambassador to China. This resulted in a cabinet reshuffle as he stepped down from his position as the Minister of Immigration and Citizenship to pursue his new post. McCallum expressed eagerness to take on the posting in Beijing, citing his strong personal connections to China, as his former riding Markham has primarily Chinese constituents and both his wife and children are of Chinese ethnicity.

On 23 January 2019, McCallum spoke to Chinese-language Canadian and state-owned Chinese media in Markham, Ontario, concerning the detainment and extradition request by the United States, which resulted in the arrest of Huawei deputy chairwoman Meng Wanzhou, who was awaiting court judgement. The United States alleges that Meng Wanzhou is in violation of the United States Sanctions against Iran and the Canadian Federal government reaffirms that they are obligated to follow judicial protocol and that the arrest is not political in nature. McCallum shared his thoughts with the media by restating public facts that could make Meng's legal defence case strong against this extradition request. This included President Donald Trump's political intrusion, which undermined the integrity of the Canadian judicial protocol, thereby contradicting Canada's stance by making it political in nature. Furthermore, McCallum re-stated other well-reported motives the United States could have, citing the alleged intent of the arrest by the United States was to attempt to obtain trade concessions from China. McCallum withdrew his comments, saying he "misspoke" and that they did "not accurately represent  position on this issue". That week, McCallum is further quoted as later telling a Toronto Star journalist it "would be great for Canada" if the US extradition request were dropped, conditional on release of Canadians since detained in China.

On 26 January 2019, McCallum submitted his resignation as ambassador to China, at the request of Prime Minister Justin Trudeau, who did not disclose the reasoning behind this decision.

Family 
He is married to Malaysian Chinese Nancy Lim and has three sons (Andrew, Jamie, and Duncan).

Electoral record

References

Bibliography

External links 
 
 
 

1950 births
Academics from Montreal
Alumni of Queens' College, Cambridge
Ambassadors of Canada to China
Anglophone Quebec people
Canadian economists
Canadian university and college faculty deans
Liberal Party of Canada MPs
Living people
McGill University alumni
Academic staff of McGill University
Members of the House of Commons of Canada from Ontario
Members of the King's Privy Council for Canada
Mining ministers of Canada
Defence ministers of Canada
Politicians from Montreal
Academic staff of Simon Fraser University
Academic staff of the University of Manitoba
University of Paris alumni
Writers from Montreal
Members of the 26th Canadian Ministry
Members of the 27th Canadian Ministry
Members of the 29th Canadian Ministry